Patrick Sonntag (born 29 June 1989) is a German former professional footballer who played as a forward.

References

External links
 

1989 births
Living people
German footballers
Association football forwards
3. Liga players
FC Erzgebirge Aue players
Sportfreunde Siegen players